César Augusto Virguetti Pinto (17 June 1955 – 29 June 2021) was a Bolivian sociologist and politician who served as a uninominal member of the Chamber of Deputies from Cochabamba representing circumscription 20 from 2020 until his death from COVID-19 in 2021. He was a member of Civic Community.

Early life and career 
César Virguetti was born on 17 June 1955 in Cochabamba. He studied sociology at the Higher University of San Simón, where he began his political activity fighting for the recovery of democracy in the country. In 1980, during the dictatorship of Luis García Meza, he was a member of an underground student committee aimed at recovering university autonomy from the government. A sociologist by profession, he later returned to the Higher University of San Simón as a professor at the Faculty of Humanities.

From 1982 to 1984, he served as executive secretary of the Association of Promotion and Education Institutions OF Cochabamba. Later, from 1993 to 2003, he was the executive director and the city's Center for Research, Promotion, and Development. An active members of the Revolutionary Left Movement and Free Bolivia Movement, he worked as executive secretary of the Cochabamba Mayor's Office from 2006 to 2007. Additionally, he worked as a researcher and consultant for various NGOs.

Chamber of Deputies 
In 2019, Virguetti participated in the foundation of the Cochabamba branch of the Civic Community (CC) alliance, serving in the front's departmental directorate. That year, he was elected as a deputy for Cochabamba in circumscription 20, though the results were annulled in the midst of a political crisis. In the rerun elections in October 2020, Virguetti achieved a second victory in the same district, winning over sixty percent of the vote.

An avid environmentalist, he served on the Chamber of Deputies' Science and Technology Committee during his brief tenure.

Commission assignments 
 Planning, Economic Policy, and Finance Commission
 Science and Technology Committee

Health issues and death 
In mid-2021, Virguetti contracted COVID-19 and was interned at a medical center in Cochabamba. After over a month in intensive care, he had a stroke as a complication of the virus and died on 29 June 2021. CC leader Carlos Mesa recalled that he was a "tireless fighter for democracy and human rights". Virguetti was married and had two children.

Electoral history

References

1955 births
2021 deaths
21st-century Bolivian politicians
Bolivian environmentalists
Bolivian sociologists
Civic Community politicians
Deaths from the COVID-19 pandemic in Bolivia
Higher University of San Simón alumni
Members of the Bolivian Chamber of Deputies from Cochabamba
People from Cochabamba